The Church of Jesus Christ of Latter-day Saints in Maryland refers to the Church of Jesus Christ of Latter-day Saints (LDS Church) and its members in Maryland. The official church membership as a percentage of general population was 0.72% in 2014. According to the 2014 Pew Forum on Religion & Public Life survey, roughly 1% of Marylanders self-identify themselves most closely with The Church of Jesus Christ of Latter-day Saints. The LDS Church is the 8th largest denomination in Maryland.

History

Erastus Snow began preaching in Maryland with three other missionaries in 1837.

The temple in Kensington is one of Maryland's most prominent landmarks and was completed in 1974.

In November 2000, the Washington D.C. Temple Visitors Center was rededicated after remodeling and the installation of new exhibits.

Stakes

As of February 2023, the following stakes had congregations located in Maryland:

 *Stakes outside the state with congregations in Maryland

Missions
Maryland Baltimore Mission 
Washington D.C. North Mission

Temple

The Washington D.C. Temple was dedicated on November 19, 1974, by President Spencer W. Kimball.

References

External links

 Newsroom (Maryland)
 ComeUntoChrist.org Latter-day Saints Visitor site
 The Church of Jesus Christ of Latter-day Saints Official site

 
Maryland